Ujme / Ojma ( or Yumai ) is a township of Akto County in Xinjiang Uygur Autonomous Region, China. Located in the northeast of the county, the township covers an area of 194 square kilometers with a population of 26,107 (as of 2015). It has 15 administrative villages under its jurisdiction. Its seat is at Hoylaerik Village .

Name

The name of Ujme is from Uighur language, meaning "mulberry".  Ujme is so named because are many mulberry trees in the area and the quality of the fruit of the mulberry trees is good.

History
In 1955, Ujme was transferred from Yengisar County to Akto County.

In 1966, Ujme Commune was established.

In 1967 during the Cultural Revolution, the commune was renamed Dongfanghong Commune (literally "The East Is Red Commune").

In 1984, the commune became Ujme Township.

In 2018, Silu Jiayuan neighborhood in Ujme became the first community to test usage of a centralized heating system in Kizilsu Prefecture.

Geography and resources
The township of Ujme is located between 75°51-76°08′ east longitude and 39°00′-39°10′ north latitude, in the alluvial plain of Kushan River on the eastern slope of Pamir Plateau and on the western edge of Tarim Basin. The Kashgar–Hotan railway runs through the territory. Its maximum distance is 24 kilometers from west to east and 19 kilometers from north to south, it has an area  of 194 square kilometers with the arable land area of 3,115 hectares. The seat of the township is 3 kilometers away from the southwest of Akto Town.

The average altitude of Ujme Township is at 1,210 meters above sea level, it has a warm temperate continental arid climate with abundant sunshine, four distinct seasons, drought and little rain. There exists large temperature difference between day and night with the average annual temperature of 10.9 ℃, the average temperature of 6.3 ℃ in January, the frost-free period of 200–240 days and the average annual precipitation of 70 to 120 mm. The main water channels are the Kunisak Channel, Ujme Channel and Kogunqi Regulating Channel. Soil is mainly irrigated warped soil (灌淤土), suitable for farming, fruit and gardening.

Administrative divisions
The township has 15 administration villages and 69 unincorporated villages.

15 administration villages
 Altungqi Village ( / Aletunqi, Aletunqicun) 
 Amash Village (Amaxi, Amaxicun) 
 Bayheti Village (Baiheti)
 Bilikeqi Village
 Hoylaerik Village (literally 'courtyard of aqueducts', Huoyila'airike)
 Jangeliavati Village (Jianggeli'awati)
 Jayterek Village ( / Jiayitiereke, Jiayitie Reke) 
 Kasherik Village ( / Kashi'airike)
 Kolbag Village (Ku'erbage)
 Kunisak Village (Kunisake, Kunisakecun) 
 Langan Village ( / )
 Qager Village (Qiage'er)
 Ujme Village (Yumai, Yumaicun) 
 Yengaymak / Yengi Aymaq Village ( / Ying'ayimake)
 Yokakhoy Village (Youkakehuoyila)

 Unincorporated villages 
 Kadirkorukmahalla
 Baymahalla

Demographics

, the population of Ujme Township was 86.9% Uyghur. As of 2015, the township has 6,679 households with a population of 26,107.

Economy
The economy of Ujme is primarily agricultural. Ujme is the main food-producing area of Akto County. Silk worms and mulberry trees are cultivated in Ujme.

References 

Township-level divisions of Akto County